Aedes polynesiensis (also known as the Polynesian tiger mosquito) is only found in the South Pacific on the islands of Austral Islands, Cook Islands, Ellice Islands, Fiji Islands, Hoorn Islands, Marquesas Islands, Pitcairn Island, Samoa Islands, Society Islands, Tokelau Islands, Tuamotu Archipelago. It is a vector of dengue, Ross River virus, and lymphatic filariasis, and a probable vector of Zika virus. Adults lay eggs in natural and human-associated pools of freshwater. Common larval habitats include tree holes, holes in volcanic rock formations, coconut shells, water storage containers (drums), and discarded trash (including tires and bottles).

References

polynesiensis
Insects described in 1951